Eleni Menegaki (born October 29, 1969), is a Greek TV presenter. In 2010, Forbes ranked Menegaki as the second-most powerful and influential celebrity in Greece and top-ranked female.

Career

Television

MEGA Channel (1991–1994) 
Eleni Menegaki started her career as a model. In 1991, she participated in the MEGA Channel morning show "Proino Cocktail." A year later, she and Giorgos Polichroniou hosted the highly successful game show "MEGA Banca."

ANT1 (1995–2005) 
In 1994, she started in the successful ANT1 comedy TV show "Pater Imon" portraying a radio producer. The next year, she began hosting the ANT1 morning show Proinos Kafes . She continued hosting the show for 10 years with great success and soon the media named her "Queen of the morning zone."

ALPHA TV (2005–2020) 
In 2005, she left ANT1 and signed to Alpha TV . She became the hostess of the morning show "Kafes me tin Eleni." Despite low ratings in the first season, it soon became a great success, especially in the commercial target group 15–44 years of age. In its last season (2010-2011), "Kafes me tin Eleni" suffered the lowest ratings ever.

In 2011, Menegaki's show changed its time starting at 13:00 and aired under the new title "Eleni." TV ratings have fluctuated. In May 2020, she announced that this will be her last season doing the show as she decided to take a break.

MEGA Channel (2021–) 
In April 2021, Mega Channel announced that Menegaki would be on their channel presenting a new show.

Advertising - Campaigns - Collaborations 
She made her first commercial in 1990 for the coffee company Melita. The same year, she also played in a commercial for the "Ultrex" shampoo company. In 1992, she starred in two companies' commercials. "Knorr" for Risonatto and the company "To Lampero" for the promotion of soybean oil. In 1993, she appeared in an advertisement for the "Famozo" window cleaner, while in 1998, she promoted the Prinos slimming center. In 2003-2004 she became the main face of the shampoo company "Lux".

In the 2010–2011 season she was the main person of the skin care company "Olay" for the promotion of the new face cream while in the 2014–2015 season she participated in the campaign of the "Alma Zois" organization for the prevention of breast cancer. From 2015 until 2019, she collaborated with the hair care company "L'Oréal Paris Greece" and is the main person for hair dyes. Also, since 2018 she has been collaborating with the company "Fage" for the yogurt "Ageladitsa".

Filmography

Television

Personal life 
Menegaki has been married three times and has four children from her second and third marriages.

At the age of 20, Menegaki married Greek entrepreneur Stavros Garderis but they separated one year later.

In 2001, Menegaki married the former ANT1's program manager Giannis Latsios. On November 15, 2002, she gave birth to their first child, a son, Aggelos-Ioannis. On February 9, 2005, she gave birth to their second child, a daughter, Laura, and three years later, on January 28, 2008, their third child, second daughter, Valeria was born. In January 2010, Menegaki announced their divorce.

In 2010, Menegaki began dating Greek entrepreneur Makis Pantzopoulos. On March 29, 2015, she gave birth to their daughter, Marina and they were married the same year.

Public image and impact 
With the success of her shows, Menegaki became the most successful celebrity in Greece. She is followed by paparazzi and makes headlines everywhere. Her divorce from Giannis Latsios became a controversial and highly discussed topic.

References

1969 births
Living people
Greek actresses
Greek television presenters
Greek women television presenters
Mass media people from Athens